Javier Manzano is a Mexican photographer known for his coverage of the country's drug wars, the War in Afghanistan and the Syrian civil war.

Life and career
Manzano was born in Mexico but moved to the United States with his family when he was 18 years old. He worked as a journalist and photographer for advertising agencies and the Rocky Mountain News until the newspaper closed its doors in 2009, after which he began working as a freelance photographer for the Associated Press, Agence France-Presse, Foreign Policy and other news outlets.

Pulitzer
Manzano's Pulitzer Prize–winning photograph was taken in October 2012 at the Karm-al Jabal district of Aleppo, Syria. It shows two Free Syrian Army soldiers guarding a sniper's nest as light streams through bullet holes in the wall behind them. Manzano is the first freelance photographer to be awarded the prize in 17 years, when Charles Porter IV and Stephanie Welsh won in 1996.

Awards 
 2011 World Press Photo Award
 2013 World Press Photo Award
 2013 Pulitzer Prize for feature photography
 2013 Bayeux-Calvados Award for war correspondents 
 2016 Pell Center Prize for Story in the Public Square
 2020 Emmy Award BEST STORY IN A NEWSCAST
 2020 Emmy Award OUTSTANDING CONTINUING COVERAGE OF A NEWS STORY IN A NEWSCAST
 2022  The Edward R. Murrow Award - Best TV, video or documentary 30 minutes for “Yemen’s Children of War”.
 2022 Peabody Awards “Transnational”.

References

External links
 Official site

Living people
Pulitzer Prize for Feature Photography winners
Year of birth missing (living people)
Mexican photojournalists